Tajpuri may refer to :

 Places
 Tajpuri State, a former princely state in Mahi Kantha, and its seat in Gujarat, India
 a village in Shirpur Taluka, Dhule District, Maharashtra, central India
 a Mohallah (quarter) in Dina, Pakistani Punjab

 Other
 a synonym for the Bengali–Assamese Rangpuri language, notably in Nepal
 Tajpuri Baloch, a prominent Baluch family in the Doab region of Uttar Pradesh, northern India

See also 
 Tejpura (disambiguation)